Ambrosia eriocentra is a North American species of ragweed known by the common names woolly bursage and woollyfruit burr ragweed.

Distribution
The plant is native to the Mojave Desert in the southwestern United States, within southern California, southern Nevada, northwestern Arizona, and southwestern Utah.

Description
The stems are brownish gray in color, with young twigs coated in light woolly fibers and older branches bare. Leaves are lance-shaped and up to 9 centimeters long, not counting the winged petioles. The leaves have rolled lobed or toothed edges.

As in other ragweeds, the inflorescence has a few staminate (male) flower heads next to several single-flowered pistillate heads. The bloom period is April to June.

The fruit is a green burr with long, silky white hairs and several hair-tufted sharp spines. The burr is around a centimeter long.

References

External links

  Calflora Database: Ambrosia eriocentra (Woolly bur sage,  Wooly bursage)
 Jepson Manual eFlora (TJM2) treatment of Ambrosia eriocentra
 UC Photos gallery: Ambrosia eriocentra

eriocentra
Flora of the California desert regions
Flora of the Southwestern United States
Natural history of the Mojave Desert
Plants described in 1868
Taxa named by Asa Gray
Flora without expected TNC conservation status